The Manakaiaua River is a river of the West Coast Region of New Zealand's South Island. It flows generally northwest from its source on the slopes of Mount Ritchie in the Bare Rocky Range, part of the Southern Alps, reaching the Tasman Sea to the north of Bruce Bay.

See also
List of rivers of New Zealand

References

Rivers of the West Coast, New Zealand
Westland District
Rivers of New Zealand